Stahr is a surname. Notable people with the surname include:

Adolf Wilhelm Theodor Stahr (1805–1876), German writer and literary historian
Elvis Jacob Stahr, Jr. (1916–1998), American government official and college president and administrator
Paul Stahr (1883–1953), American illustrator for pulp posters, books, and magazines covers
Mike Stahr (born 1964), American track and field runner, won 1982 and 1983 Millrose Games High School mile
Walter Stahr, international lawyer and writer

Fictional characters:
Monroe Stahr, character in The Last Tycoon, an unfinished novel by F. Scott Fitzgerald

See also
Starr (disambiguation)
Star (disambiguation)